Woodford v. Ngo, 548 U.S. 81 (2006), is a United States Supreme Court case about the procedures determining when prison litigation may be commenced in federal court.  Justice Samuel Alito, writing for the majority, ruled that prisoners must exhaust all state-court remedies in accordance with the rules thereof before filing claims in federal court.  Justice Stephen Breyer filed a concurrence.  Justice John Paul Stevens filed a dissent.

Background 
The Prison Litigation Reform Act of 1995 (PLRA) requires a prisoner to exhaust any available administrative remedies before challenging prison conditions in federal court.  Ngo, an inmate at San Quentin State Prison (serving a life sentence for murder) filed a grievance with California prison officials about conditions in the prison, but it was rejected as untimely under state law.  He then sued the prison officials under §1983 in the Federal District Court.

The District Court granted the prison officials' motion to dismiss on the ground that respondent had not fully exhausted his administrative remedies under the PLRA.  The Ninth Circuit Court of Appeals reversed, holding that respondent had exhausted those remedies because none remained available to him.  The Supreme Court granted certiorari.

Issue 
The question presented was "whether a prisoner can satisfy the Prison Litigation Reform Act's exhaustion requirement ... by filing an untimely or otherwise procedurally defective administrative grievance or appeal."

Parties' arguments 
The prison officials argued that a prisoner must complete the administrative review process in accordance with the applicable procedural rules, including deadlines, before bringing suit in federal court.  Ngo's attorneys, on the other hand, argued that this provision simply means that a prisoner may not bring suit in federal court until administrative remedies are no longer available, even if the reason they are no longer available is due to the prisoner's own non-compliance with the applicable rules.

Opinion of the Court 
Justice Alito, for the majority, ruled in favor of the prison officials, writing that "proper exhaustion demands compliance with an agency's deadlines and other critical procedural rules because no adjudicative system can function effectively without imposing some orderly structure on the course of its proceedings."  The point of the PLRA, he continues, is to avoid "unwarranted federal-court interference with the administration of prisons," and to allow Ngo's interpretation would frustrate the goal of the legislation.

Concurrence 
Justice Breyer concurred in the judgment.  While he agreed with the Court's interpretation of "exhaustion" in this case, he wrote also that administrative law "contains well established exceptions to exhaustion."

Dissent 
Justice Stevens wrote a dissenting opinion.  In that dissent, joined by Justices Souter and Ginsburg, Stevens writes that "The plain text of the PLRA simply requires that such administrative remedies as are available be exhausted before the prisoner can take the serious step of filing a federal lawsuit against the officials who hold him in custody."  He interprets this to mean any exhaustion, not just "proper exhaustion," and says that the Court has read its own interpretation into the statute.

References

External links
 

United States Supreme Court cases
United States Supreme Court cases of the Roberts Court
United States civil procedure case law
2006 in United States case law
San Quentin State Prison